Austria is a surname. Notable people with the surname include:

Alli Austria (born 1990), Filipino basketball player
Amy Austria (born 1961), Filipina actress
Leo Austria (born 1958), Filipino basketball player and coach
Steve Austria (born 1958),  American politician

Spanish-language surnames